Stripes is an open source web application framework based on the model–view–controller (MVC) pattern. It aims to be a lighter weight framework than Struts by using Java technologies such as annotations and generics that were introduced in Java 1.5, to achieve "convention over configuration". This emphasizes the idea that a set of simple conventions used throughout the framework reduce configuration overhead. In practice, this means that Stripe applications barely need any configuration files, thus reducing development and maintenance work. It has been dormant since 2016.

Features
 Action based MVC framework
 No configuration files
 POJOs
 Annotations replace XML configuration files
 Flexible and simple parameter binding
 Search engine friendly URLs
 Runs in J2EE web container
 JUnit integration
 Easy internationalization
 Wizard support
 JSP layouts
 JSP or freemarker templates as View
 Spring integration
 JPA support
 AJAX support
 Fileupload support
 Compatible with Google App Engine
 Open-source
 Lightweight

Example
A Hello World Stripes application, with just two files:
 HelloAction.java
import net.sourceforge.stripes.action.ActionBean;
import net.sourceforge.stripes.action.ActionBeanContext;
import net.sourceforge.stripes.action.DefaultHandler;
import net.sourceforge.stripes.action.ForwardResolution;
import net.sourceforge.stripes.action.Resolution;
import net.sourceforge.stripes.action.UrlBinding;

@UrlBinding("/hello-{name=}.html")
public class HelloAction implements ActionBean {
    private ActionBeanContext context;
    private String name;

    public ActionBeanContext getContext() {
        return context;
    }

    public void setContext(ActionBeanContext context) {
        this.context = context;
    }

    public void setName(String name) {
        this.name = name;
    }

    public String getName() {
        return name;
    }

    @DefaultHandler
    public Resolution view() {
        return new ForwardResolution(“/WEB-INF/HelloWorld.jsp”);
    }
}

 HelloWorld.jsp
<html><body>
    Hello ${actionBean.name}<br/>
    <br/>
    <s:link beanclass="HelloAction"><s:param name="name" value="John"/>Try again</s:link><br />
</body></html>

No additional configuration files needed.

Bibliography

External links

Java enterprise platform
Free software programmed in Java (programming language)
Web frameworks
Articles with example Java code